Bert Manfred Fernald (April 3, 1858August 23, 1926) was an American farmer, businessman, and Republican politician who became the 47th Governor of Maine and a United States senator. He was chairman of the United States Senate Committee on Public Buildings and Grounds for three terms.

Early life, education, and career
Born in West Poland, Maine, Fernald suffered debilitating injuries from an early age, enduring several operations and not beginning to walk until he was six years old. He attended the public schools, and then Hebron Academy until the age of seventeen, when his father died. He then entered a business and preparatory school in Boston, after which he taught school (and was elected supervisor of schools in 1878), and then engaged in the canning, dairy, and telephone businesses. He returned to his family farm, where he "established one of the best Holstein herds in the State", and a corn canning operation. He was elected to the Maine House of Representatives and served from 1896 to 1898 where he "attracted attention by several able speeches", and where his tenure was marked by his fine singing voice, and then from 1898 to 1902 in the Maine Senate.

Governorship
Fernald was a candidate for Governor of Maine in 1904, but was unsuccessful in his bid for the Republican nomination. However, he remained popular in the party, and ultimately secured the nomination in 1908 "without a dissenting vote". He was elected, and served as a Governor of Maine from 1909 until 1911. In 1910, he was also elected president of the National Canners Association. In April 1909, Fernald vetoed a bill providing mandatory sentences in liquor cases, contending that it would deprive the courts of discretion.

Senate career
In 1916 he was elected as a Republican to the U.S. Senate by defeating Kenneth C.M. Sills, who was then Dean of Bowdoin College, to fill the vacancy caused by the death of Edwin C. Burleigh. In the Senate, Fernand took office on September 12, 1916 and was initially "a radical in his party", but eventually "became one of the staunchest of the Old Guard as he rose to an important position". In his first term, he opposed farm credit measures being debated in Congress, disputing claims that deflation in the aftermath of World War I disproportionately affected farmers. Fernald was reelected in 1918, and in 1919, he "rose to the defense of the packers, then under criticism by the Federal Trade Commission", characterizing the regulation of that industry as "badgering, harrying and heckling American business interests". He supported President Calvin Coolidge, but opposed U.S. entry into the Permanent Court of International Justice. He was reelected again in 1924 and served until his death. He died in West Poland, Maine on August 23, 1926, aged 68.

Personal life, death, and legacy
Fernald married Annie Keene in 1877, with whom he had a daughter and a son. A large man, in 1909, Fernald was a speaker at the annual meeting, in Portland, of the "New England Fat Men's Association", all of whose members had to weigh at least 201 pounds.

Fernald died at his home in West Portland, Maine, following a ten-day illness, at the age of 68. The Fernald family farm is still in existence. Its white barn has the name Fernald Family Farm in black visible from the road.

See also 
 List of United States Congress members who died in office (1900–1949)

References

External links
 

1858 births
1926 deaths
Republican Party Maine state senators
Republican Party governors of Maine
People from Poland, Maine
Members of the Universalist Church of America
Republican Party United States senators from Maine
20th-century Christian universalists
19th-century Christian universalists
Republican Party members of the Maine House of Representatives